Douglas William Jarrett (April 22, 1944 – February 10, 2014) was a Canadian ice hockey defenceman, who played in the National Hockey League (NHL) with the Chicago Black Hawks and New York Rangers.

After his playing career, Jarrett periodically worked on behalf of the Chicago Blackhawk Alumni Association. Born in London, Ontario, Jarrett was inducted into the London Sports Hall of Fame in 2011. He died of cancer in 2014 at the age of 69.

Career statistics

References

External links
 

1944 births
2014 deaths
Canadian ice hockey defencemen
Chicago Blackhawks players
Sportspeople from London, Ontario
New York Rangers players
Ice hockey people from Ontario